The Russo-Japanese War Medal or Medal in Memory of the Russo-Japanese War was a medal issued by the Russian Empire to those who had fought in the Russo-Japanese War and to nurses, medics, priest and other civilians who had distinguished themselves during combat operations. It was established on 21 January 1906 by Nicholas II of Russia and was awarded in silver, bronze and copper.

Sources
 http://medalirus.ru/stati/lozovskiy-medal-russko-yaponskoy-voyny.php#_ftnref5

1906 establishments in the Russian Empire
Military awards and decorations of Russia
Russo-Japanese War